India participated for the first time in 1934 British Empire Games. India won 1 bronze medal in these games. Indian athletes participated only in Athletics and Wrestling.

Wrestling
India won its first medal of Commonwealth Games in wrestling. The only Indian athlete in Wrestling Rashid Anwar won bronze medal in Men's Welterweight Division (74 kg).

References

Nations at the 1934 British Empire Games
India at the Commonwealth Games
1934 in Indian sport